George "The Terminator" Linberger (born January 23, 1967) is a former college and professional American football player, a former professional boxer, and a current CEO and business owner focused on working with school-aged children with disabilities from Akron, Ohio.

Early life 
Linberger attended Chardon High School, where he was an all-conference, all-district, and all-state tight end. He was the team leader in receptions his junior and senior year. He also anchored the defensive line and was recruited by several division one programs before settling on the University of Toledo. He also excelled on the wrestling mat, where he compiled a 56-19 record during his high school career.

Football career 
Linberger played college football at the University of Toledo where he was a four-year starter. Linberger was a first team All-Mid-American Conference performer in 1989, team captain 1989, team MVP (1989) as well as a nominee for Mid-American conference player of the year. After graduation and going undrafted he was signed as a free agent by the Detroit Lions. He then was drafted by the WLAF's San Antonio Riders in the fifth round of the OL draft. He also played in the Arena Football League (AFL) during the 1994 season for the Las Vegas Sting and later played for the Ohio Valley Greyhounds of the Indoor Football League during their 2000 season.

Boxing career 
As a boxer, Linberger compiled a record of 29 wins, 9 losses, 1 draw and 1 no contest.  
Linberger would win several minor belts during his career but his biggest victory was gaining revenge against the "King of the 4 Rounders" Eric "Butterbean" Esch for the NABC super heavyweight title. He also shared the ring with world heavyweight champion Nikolay Valuev, and European Champion Brian Nielsen. He was often a fan favorite on the Midwest circuit.

Post-retirement
Linberger is the CEO of the LEAP and SOAR alternative programs located throughout Northeast Ohio that he oversees, owns, and operates . His schools work with students with Behavioral and Learning disabilities between eight locations that work with as many as 600 challenged students each year.

Linberger is married to Angel Linberger (Carl) and has two children: his daughter Ariel and his son George Jr.

Professional boxing record 

|-  style="text-align:center; background:#e3e3e3;"
|  style="border-style:none none solid solid; "|Result
|  style="border-style:none none solid solid; "|Record
|  style="border-style:none none solid solid; "|Opponent
|  style="border-style:none none solid solid; "|Type
|  style="border-style:none none solid solid; "|Round
|  style="border-style:none none solid solid; "|Date
|  style="border-style:none none solid solid; "|Location
|  style="border-style:none none solid solid; "|Notes
|- align=center
|Loss
|29-9-1
|align=left| Joe Mesi
|TKO
|1 
|
|align=left| 
|align=left|
|- align=center
|Win
|29-8-1
|align=left| Eric Esch
|SD
|4 
|
|align=left| 
|align=left|
|- align=center
|Win
|28-8-1
|align=left| Jeff Yeoman
|KO
| 
|
|align=left| 
|align=left|
|- align=center
|style="background:#ddd;"|NC
|27-8-1
|align=left| Russell Chasteen
|NC
|1
|
|align=left| 
|align=left|
|- align=center
|Win
|27-8-1
|align=left| Paul Phillips
|KO
| 
|
|align=left| 
|align=left|
|- align=center
|Win
|26-8-1
|align=left| Kevin Tallon
|TKO
| 
|
|align=left| 
|align=left|
|- align=center
|Win
|25-8-1
|align=left| Gerald Armfield
|KO
| 
|
|align=left| 
|align=left|
|- align=center
|Loss
|24-8-1
|align=left| Allen Smith
|TKO
| 
|
|align=left| 
|align=left|
|- align=center
|Win
|24-7-1
|align=left| Gerald Moore
|KO
| 
|
|align=left| 
|align=left|
|- align=center
|Win
|23-7-1
|align=left| Calvin Miller
|TKO
| 
|
|align=left| 
|align=left|
|- align=center
|Win
|22-7-1
|align=left| Tim Ray
|TKO
|6 
|
|align=left| 
|align=left|
|- align=center
|Win
|21-7-1
|align=left| Kevin Tallon
|TKO
| 
|
|align=left| 
|align=left|
|- align=center
|Win
|20-7-1
|align=left| Abdul Muhaymin
|UD
| 
|
|align=left| 
|align=left|
|- align=center
|Loss
|19-7-1
|align=left| Nikolai Valuev
|TKO
| 
|
|align=left| 
|align=left|
|- align=center
|Win
|19-6-1
|align=left| Brian Yates
|PTS
| 
|
|align=left| 
|align=left|
|- align=center
|Loss
|18-6-1
|align=left| Troy Weida
|TKO
| 
|
|align=left| 
|align=left|
|- align=center
|Loss
|18-5-1
|align=left| Eric Esch
|TKO
| 
|
|align=left| 
|align=left|
|- align=center
|style="background:#ddd;"|Draw
|18-4-1
|align=left| Mike McGrady
|PTS
| 
|
|align=left| 
|align=left|
|- align=center
|Win
|18-4
|align=left| Mike DeVito
|TKO
| 
|
|align=left| 
|align=left|
|- align=center
|Win
|17-4
|align=left| Demetrius Liddell
|KO
| 
|
|align=left| 
|align=left|
|- align=center
|Win
|16-4
|align=left| Marvin Hill
|TKO
| 
|
|align=left| 
|align=left|
|- align=center
|Win
|15-4
|align=left| Mike DeVito
|TKO
| 
|
|align=left| 
|align=left|
|- align=center
|Win
|14-4
|align=left| Wesley Smith
|UD
| 
|
|align=left| 
|align=left|
|- align=center
|Loss
|13-4
|align=left| Brian Nielsen
|TKO
| 
|
|align=left| 
|align=left|
|- align=center
|Win
|13-3
|align=left| James Holley
|TKO
| 
|
|align=left| 
|align=left|
|- align=center
|Win
|12-3
|align=left| Paul Dawson
|TKO
| 
|
|align=left| 
|align=left|
|- align=center
|Win
|11-3
|align=left| George Harris
|TKO
| 
|
|align=left| 
|align=left|
|- align=center
|Win
|10-3
|align=left| Moses Harris
|KO
| 
|
|align=left| 
|align=left|
|- align=center
|Win
|9-3
|align=left| George Harris
|TKO
| 
|
|align=left| 
|align=left|
|- align=center
|Loss
|8-3
|align=left| Patrick Freeman
|TKO
| 
|
|align=left| 
|align=left|
|- align=center
|Win
|8-2
|align=left| Kevin Poindexter
|TKO
| 
|
|align=left| 
|align=left|
|- align=center
|Win
|7-2
|align=left| James Holley
|KO
| 
|
|align=left| 
|align=left|
|- align=center
|Win
|6-2
|align=left| Moses Harris
|TKO
| 
|
|align=left| 
|align=left|
|- align=center
|Win
|5-2
|align=left| Robert Curry
|KO
| 
|
|align=left| 
|align=left|
|- align=center
|Win
|4-2
|align=left| Ed Strickland
|TKO
| 
|
|align=left| 
|align=left|
|- align=center
|Loss
|3-2
|align=left| Jim Davis
|PTS
| 
|
|align=left| 
|align=left|
|- align=center
|Win
|3-1
|align=left| Mike Jones
|TKO
| 
|
|align=left| 
|align=left|
|- align=center
|Win
|2-1
|align=left| J R Nichols
|TKO
| 
|
|align=left| 
|align=left|
|- align=center
|Win
|1–1
|align=left| David Platt
|TKO
| 
|
|align=left| 
|align=left|
|- align=center
|Loss
|0–1
|align=left| Mike Owens
|UD
| 
|
|align=left| 
|align=left|
|- align=center

Accomplishments 

1st team All Mid-American conference
Nicholson Award winner (Toledo MVP)
Nominee for the Vern Smith award (MAC MVP)

References

External links 
 
 
 
 Terminator vs Butterbean

Living people
1967 births
Heavyweight boxers
American male boxers